Stathmonotus gymnodermis, the naked blenny, is a species of chaenopsid blenny found in coral reefs from the Bahamas and Puerto Rico to coasts of northern South America, in the western Atlantic ocean. It can reach a maximum length of  TL.

References

gymnodermis
Fish described in 1955
Taxa named by Victor G. Springer